The Ministry of Science and Technology (Abrv: MOST), was a Thai government body responsible for the oversight of science and technology in Thailand.

Background

Creation
The Ministry of Science and Technology was created by the Restructuring of Government Agencies Act of 2002, split off from the Ministry of Science, Technology and Environment, which operated from 1992 until 2002.

Dissolution
On 24 October 2018, the Thai cabinet approved the creation of the Ministry of Higher Education Science Research and Innovation. The new ministry will merge the Ministry of Science and Technology, the Office of the Higher Education Commission (OHEC), the National Research Council of Thailand, and the Thailand Research Fund. The current Minister of Science and Technology, Suvit Maesincee, will head the new ministry. Its mission will be "...to develop high technology, enhancing the efficiency of the R&D and support Thailand 4.0 policy, as well as human resource development." The government has allotted a 97 billion baht budget to the new ministry in its first year, FY2019.

On 1 May 2019, the Royal Gazette published the Act of Ministries, Bureaus, and Departments Improvement (No. 19), 2562 BE, which is effective on 2 May 2019, resulting in the Ministry of Higher Education, Science, Research and Innovation establishment came up instead of the Ministry of Science and Technology that was dissolved.

Budget
The ministry's budget for FY2019 is 14,885.4 million baht.

Organization

Departments 
 Office of the Minister
 Office of the Permanent Secretary
 Office of Atoms for Peace
 Department of Science Service (DSS)

Supervised public organizations 
 National Science and Technology Development Agency
 National Institute of Metrology
 National Science Technology and Innovation Policy Office
 Geo-Informatics and Space Technology Development Agency
 National Astronomical Research Institute of Thailand
 National Innovation Agency
 Thailand Institute of Nuclear Technology
 Synchrotron Light Research Institute 
 Hydro and Agro Informatics Institute
 Thailand Center of Excellence for Life Sciences

State enterprises 
 Thailand Institute of Scientific and Technological Research
 National Science Museum

See also
 List of government ministries of Thailand

References

Science and Technology
Science and technology in Thailand
Thailand
2002 establishments in Thailand
Government agencies established in 2002